Li Curt railway station is a railway station in the municipality of Poschiavo, in the Swiss canton of Graubünden. It is located on the Bernina line of the Rhaetian Railway.

The station is located on a road-side section of the Bernina line, and comprises a single track with a single platform and a station building. To the north of the station, the line shares the street with road traffic as it passes the Sant'Antonio church. To the south, as far as Le Prese, the line runs alongside the road.

Services
The following services stop at Li Curt:

References

External links
 
 

Railway stations in Graubünden
Rhaetian Railway stations
Poschiavo
Railway stations in Switzerland opened in 1908